Alejandro Jesus Aguilar Bolaños (born 10 October 1990) is a Costa Rican footballer who plays as a forward for FC Arizona.

Club career
Aguilar made his professional debut for Alajuelense in January 2011 against Cartaginés and had a loan spell at Carmelita in 2012/13  but returned to Alajuelense in summer 2013.

In July 2016 it was announced that Aguilar had signed a 1-year contract with the Pittsburgh Riverhounds of the USL with a club option for an additional year.

International career
Aguilar made his debut for Costa Rica in a May 2013 friendly match against Canada, which has remained his sole international game by January 2014.

References

External links
 
 

1990 births
Living people
Association football forwards
Costa Rican men's footballers
Costa Rica international footballers
L.D. Alajuelense footballers
A.D. Carmelita footballers
Pittsburgh Riverhounds SC players
FC Arizona players
Liga FPD players
USL Championship players
National Premier Soccer League players